John Joseph Haley III (October 25, 1933 – April 21, 2001), known as Jack Haley Jr., was an American director, producer and writer, and a two-time recipient of the Emmy Award. His credits include directing the 1974 compilation film That's Entertainment!. 

He was the second husband of Liza Minnelli, daughter of Judy Garland, who had starred with his father in The Wizard of Oz.

Early life
Haley was born on October 25, 1933 in Los Angeles, the son of actor/comedian Jack Haley and his wife Florence.

Career
As a producer, Haley was responsible for compilations and documentaries about film history, including Hollywood and the Stars (1963-1964), That's Entertainment! (1974), That's Dancing! (1985) and The Wonderful Wizard of Oz: 50 Years of Magic, narrated by Angela Lansbury. Haley's other credits include producer and executive producer of Academy Awards presentation shows. He directed the 1970 film Norwood and the 1971 film The Love Machine.

With David Wolper, Haley produced the original run of Biography from 1961 to 1962.

Death
Haley developed respiratory failure and died on April 21, 2001 in Santa Monica, California. He is buried in Culver City's Holy Cross Cemetery.

Awards and honors

Peabody Award

Primetime Emmy Awards

Directors Guild of America

NAACP Image Awards

Monte-Carlo Television Festival

Venice Film Festival

Western Heritage Awards

Western Writers of America

References

External links
 

1933 births
2001 deaths
20th-century American male writers
American film directors
American film historians
American male non-fiction writers
Burials at Holy Cross Cemetery, Culver City
Emmy Award winners
WFUV people
Historians from New York (state)